Wintrebert is a surname. Notable people with the surname include:

Joëlle Wintrebert (born 1949), French writer
Paul Wintrebert (1867–1966), French embryologist